Credit One Stadium is a tennis stadium located within the Family Circle Tennis Center tennis complex on Daniel Island in Charleston, South Carolina. Built in 2001, the Family Circle Tennis Center has 17 courts, including the 10,200-seat main stadium, named the Credit One Stadium after Credit One Bank became the new title sponsor in 2021. Since 2001, it has hosted the WTA Tour's Charleston Open, a WTA 500 tournament, and is the only facility to host an event on the WTA Tour that is played on green Har-Tru clay courts.

History
In April 2021, the Charleston Open marked the groundbreaking for the center's new main stadium. After some portions of the original stadium were demolished, the new seating sections were built along with a new 70,000-square-foot, four-story Stage House for all players' facilities that is topped by a new canopy providing shade and rigging capacity for shows. The renovations expanded the stadium's seating capacity from 7,000 to 11,000 patrons. Additional upgrades were made to the facility's lighting, landscaping, concession offerings, and bathroom facilities.

In July 2021, the Charleston Open named Credit One Bank as the title sponsor for the tennis tournament. The bank took over the naming rights for the center's main stadium in a multi-year deal.

Performances 

Credit One Stadium has hosted concerts in the summer for 20 years such as John Mayer, Moody Blues, O.A.R., Train with needtobreathe, Blues Traveler with Cracker, Hootie & the Blowfish with Collective Soul, Bob Dylan, The Lumineers, Barenaked Ladies, The Killers, Everclear, fun., Willie Nelson, Plain White T's with Daughtry and Goo Goo Dolls, Third Eye Blind, Alabama Shakes, Ellie Goulding, Ben Folds, Death Cab for Cutie, Panic! at the Disco with Weezer, Sister Hazel, Jimmy Buffett, Our Lady Peace with Tonic, B-52's with Culture Club and Tom Bailey of Thompson Twins, Phish, Dave Matthews Band, Elton John, Stevie Nicks, Zac Brown Band, Black Keys with Band of Horses, and 311 with Dirty Heads. The Hootie & the Blowfish album Live in Charleston was recorded there on August 12, 2005.

See also
 List of tennis stadiums by capacity

References

External links 

Volvo Cars Open
Family Circle Tennis Center at World Stadiums
Family Circle Tennis Center site map
Davis Cup USA vs Belarus September 2004

Sports venues in South Carolina
Tennis venues in the United States
Sports venues in Charleston, South Carolina
2001 establishments in South Carolina
Sports venues completed in 2001
Tennis in South Carolina
Outdoor arenas